Events from 1933 in Catalonia.

Incumbents

 President of the Generalitat of Catalonia – Francesc Macià (until 25 December) – Joan Casanovas (acting, from 25 December)

Events
 25 May – The Parliament approve the Statute of Internal Regime of Catalonia.
 October – Creation of the Republican Left Nationalist Party as a split from ERC, led by Joan Lluhí, critical of the hegemony of Macià.
 1 June – Establishment of the Autonomous University of Barcelona.
 19 November – Spanish general election. In Catalonia, the conservative Regionalist League recover the first place, but the left-wing forces resist.
 25 December – Francesc Macià dies. Joan Casanovas, president of the Parliament, provisionally assumes the position of President of the Generalitat.

Births
 12 April - Montserrat Caballé, operatic soprano (d. 2018)

References